Mackay North State High School is located in the Mackay region, Queensland, Australia and was established in 1964 with an enrolment of 209 students in years eight and nine. The school motto is 'Meliora Sequimur' which translates to 'We strive for the best'. The school has a consistently well populated student body and has recently peaked at over 1400 students as well as over 130 staff members.

History 
The school was opened in January 1964 with an enrolment of 209 students in years eight and nine. Mr. JD Cassidy was the first principal with a staff of nine teachers.

The school was opened by Hon. R E Camm.

Facilities 
 First Year Centre
 Community Hall and swimming pool
 Senior Centre
 200 seat Auditorium
 Catering Kitchen
 Shaded Terrace Seating
 Specialized Modern Art, Music, Home Economics, Manual Arts and Performing Arts Blocks
 15 Computer Laboratories
 Basketball, Cricket and Athletics facilities

Notable alumni
 Benita Willis - Australian representative to the 2012 Olympics in Athletics.

References

External links
 Mackay North website

Schools in Mackay, Queensland
Educational institutions established in 1964
1964 establishments in Australia